Eugene Augustus Hoffman (March 21, 1829 – June 17, 1902) was a United States clergyman.

Biography
Eugene Augustus Hoffman was born in New York City on March 21, 1829, the son of Samuel Verplanck Hoffman. He was educated at Columbia Grammar School, then Rutgers and Harvard colleges and the General Theological Seminary. 

He held successive rectorships at Elizabeth, New Jersey, Burlington, New Jersey, Brooklyn, New York, and Philadelphia, and in 1879 was appointed dean of the General Theological Seminary in New York. 

He was a man of great wealth and, with others of his family, heavily endowed this seminary. He built Christ Church and rectory at Elizabeth, and also churches at Woodbridge and Millburn, New Jersey.

Eugene Augustus Hoffman died in Manhattan on June 17, 1902.

Works
His writings include Free Churches (1858) and The Eucharistic Week (1859 and 1893).

Notes

References

Further reading
 Theodore M. Riley, Memorial Biography of E. A. Hoffman, two volumes, (New York, 1904)
Bibliographic directory from Project Canterbury

1829 births
1902 deaths
American Episcopal clergy
Columbia Grammar & Preparatory School alumni
Rutgers University alumni
Harvard College alumni
General Theological Seminary alumni
General Theological Seminary faculty
19th-century American Episcopalians
19th-century American clergy